The Boulevard du Général-d'Armée-Jean-Simon is a boulevard in the 13th arrondissement of Paris, France. It is one of the Boulevards of the Marshals, which run in the outer parts of the city.

Route 
The boulevard continues the route of Boulevard Masséna from Porte de Vitry (southwestern terminus) to Porte de la Gare at the intersection of Quais Panhard-et-Levassor and d'Ivry (northeastern end). It forms a viaduct that crosses the tracks of the Austerlitz train station and overlooks the southern pat of the Paris Rive Gauche neighborhood. It is continued by the Pont National, which crosses the Seine river and connects to Boulevard Poniatowski.

The boulevard is served by the stations Maryse Bastié et Avenue de France of the tramway Line T3a.

History 
As the former "CA/13 way", the boulevard was named after General Jules Simon (1814–1896), an officer of the Ground Army and the French Foreign Legion and a member of the Free French Forces, and was inaugurated as such on September 25, 2013. The boulevard was part of the arrangement plan of Paris Rive Gauche.

Important buildings 
At No. 36 stands the M6B2 tower, also called "Biodiversity Tower", a vegetated high-rise with public housings. It was designed by Édouard François and built in 2015 for Paris Habitat.

References 

Général d Armée Jean Simon
Streets in the 13th arrondissement of Paris